This is a listing of places in Lexington, Middlesex County, in the U.S. state of Massachusetts, that are listed in the National Register of Historic Places.


Current listings

|}

References

Lexington
Lexington
Lexington, Massachusetts